Les Indés Radio is a groupement d'intérêt économique (Economic Interest Grouping) created in 1992, and currently composed of 125 local radio stations in France.

History
In November 1992, the GIE Les Indépendants (The Independents) was created, following the initiative taken by Jean-Éric Valli (owner of the Sud Radio Groupe)

In November 2010, the group was renamed to become Les Indés Radio

List of radio stations

Owned
These radio stations are members of Les Indés Radios, but owned by a group:
 Arthur World Participation Group
 OÜI FM - AWPG
 Nice Radio
 Espace Group
 Alpes 1
 Générations
 Jazz Radio (broadcasts since 1996; 2008 renamed from Fréquence Jazz)
 Là la Radio
 La Radio Plus
 ODS Radio
 Radio Espace
 Radio RVA 
 Virage Radio
 Groupe La Voix
 Champagne FM
 Contact
 HPI Groupe
 Chante France
 Évasion FM (HPI Groupe)
 ISA Media Development
 Radio Isa
 Radio No1
 Sofirad (Société financière de radiodiffusion)
 Africa n° 1
 Sud Radio Groupe
 Ado FM
 Black Box
 Forum
 Sud Radio
 Vibration
 Voltage
 Wit FM

Fully independent
These stations are independent, and member of Les Indés Radios:

A-F
 100% Radio
 47 FM
 Activ Radio
 Aligre FM
 Alouette FM
 Aquitaine Radio Live
 Beur FM
 Canal FM
 Collines FM
 Delta FM
 D!rect FM
 Durance FM
 Echo FM
 Émotion FM
 Est FM
 FC Radio
 Flash FM
 Flor FM
 FMC Radio
 France Maghreb 2
 Fréquence Grands Lacs
 Fréquence Horizon
 Fréquence Plus
 Fusion FM

G-P
 Gold FM
 Grand Sud FM
 Happy FM
 Hit West
 Hot Radio
 Impact FM
 Inside Radio
 Intensité
 Jordanne FM
 K6FM
 Kiss FM (Nice)
 Latina
 Littoral FM
 Lor'FM
 Lyon 1ère
 Magnum la radio
 Maritima Radio
 Mistral FM
 Mixx Radio
 Mona FM
 Montagne FM
 MTI
 Océane FM
 Or'FM
 Plein Air

R
 Radio Bonheur
 Radio 6
 Radio 8
 Radio Alfa
 Radio Azur
 Radio Bonheur
 Radio Caroline
 Radio Côte d'amour
 Radio Cristal
 Radio Dreyeckland
 Radio ECN
 Radio FG
 Radio Galaxie
 Radio Jérico
 Radio Latitude
 Radio Liberté
 Radio Mélodie
 Radio Ménergy
 Radio Metropolys
 Radio Mont Blanc
 Radio Orient
 Radio Oxygène
 Radio Rezo
 Radio Scoop

R-V
 Radio Star
 Radio Studio 1	
 Radio VFM
 Radio Vitamine	
 RadiOcéan
 Radio RCN	
 RDL Radio
 Résonance
 RMB
 RMN FM
 RTS FM
 RV1
 RVM
 Sea FM
 Sun 101.5
 Sweet FM
 Tempo La Radio
 Tendance Ouest
 TFM
 Tonic Radio
 Top Music
 Totem
 Toulouse FM
 Tropiques FM
 Urban Hit
 Variation

External links

Trade associations based in France
Mass media companies established in 1992
Radio broadcasting companies of France